The 2023 Nigerian presidential election in Ondo State will be held on 25 February 2023 as part of the nationwide 2023 Nigerian presidential election to elect the president and vice president of Nigeria. Other federal elections, including elections to the House of Representatives and the Senate, will also be held on the same date while state elections will be held two weeks afterward on 11 March.

Background
Ondo State is a Yoruba-majority southwestern state; politically, the state's 2019 elections were categorized as a continuation of the state's competitiveness as PDP presidential nominee Atiku Abubakar won the state by 6% and the party won two senate seats. However, the APC won five of nine House of Representatives seats and a majority in the House of Assembly. The next year, incumbent Governor Rotimi Akeredolu (APC) won re-election by over 17%.

Polling

Projections

General election

Results

By senatorial district 
The results of the election by senatorial district.

By federal constituency
The results of the election by federal constituency.

By local government area 
The results of the election by local government area.

See also 
 2023 Ondo State elections
 2023 Nigerian presidential election

Notes

References 

Ondo State gubernatorial election
2023 Ondo State elections
Ondo